Wied il-Għasel is a valley in Mosta, Malta. Several caves are located within the valley, one of which is occupied by the Chapel of St. Paul the Hermit. The Victoria lines also go through the valley. Multiple walking paths and vistas are also accessible.

References 

Valleys of Malta
Mosta